Kadare or Kaddare is the surname of the following people:

Besiana Kadare (born 1972), Albanian Ambassador to the UN, daughter of Helena and Ismail
Helena Kadare (born 1943), Albanian author of short stories and novels
Hussein Sheikh Ahmed Kaddare (1934–2015), Somali inventor
Kaddare alphabet
Ismail Kadare (born 1936), Albanian novelist, poet, essayist, and playwright, husband of Helena and father of Besiana 
Kadare Prize
 

Albanian-language surnames